Angrboða (also Angrboda) is a jötunn in Norse mythology. She is the mate of Loki and the mother of monsters. She is only mentioned once in the Poetic Edda (Völuspá hin skamma) as the mother of Fenrir by Loki. The Prose Edda (Gylfaginning) describes her as "a giantess in Jötunheimar" and as the mother of three monsters: the wolf Fenrir, the Midgard serpent Jörmungandr, and the ruler of the dead Hel.

Name
The Old Norse name Angrboða has been translated as 'the one who brings grief', 'she-who-offers-sorrow', or 'harm-bidder'. The first element is related to the English word "anger", but means "sorrow" or "regret" in Old Norse, the later meaning is retained in Scandinavian languages. In Norwegian and Danish the word is rendered as "anger" while Icelandic and Faroese has "angur" and Swedish "ånger". The second element "boða" is cognate with the English word bode as in "this does not bode well".

According to some scholars, the name Angrboða is probably a late invention dating from no earlier than the 12th century, although the tradition of the three monsters born of Loki and a jötunn may be of greater age.

Attestations

Angrboða 
In Völuspá hin skamma (Short Völuspá; a poem of Hyndluljóð), Angrboða is mentioned as the mate of Loki and mother of the wolf (Fenrir).

Gylfaginning (Beguiling of Gylfi) mentions the three monstrous children of Angrboða: the wolf Fenrir, the Midgard serpent Jörmungand, and the ruler of the dead Hel.

Giantess in Ironwood

Völuspá (Prophecy of the Völva) also mentions a jötunn living in Járnvid (Ironwood, the forest where female jötnar live), most likely identified with Angrboða.

This stanza is paraphrased by Snorri Sturluson in Gylfaginning:
In the stanza 42 of Völuspá, Eggþér is portrayed as the herder of the jötunn who lives in Járnviðr (Ironwood). Peter H. Salus and Paul B. Taylor argue that he may have been Angrboða's wolf-herder.

In popular culture
Angrboða appears as a minor character in the 2020 video game Assassin's Creed Valhalla, and a supporting character in the 2022 video game God of War Ragnarök.

Angrboða appears as the main character in Genevieve cap Gornichec's 2021 novel The Witch's Heart. In the novel, her character is also known as Gullveig.

The boatbuilder Floki names his daughter for Angrboða in the television series Vikings.

Saturn's moon Angrboda is named after her.

References

Bibliography

Gýgjar
Loki